Nellie Gray may refer to:

 Nellie Gray (activist) (1924–2012), American anti-abortion activist and founder of U.S. March for Life
 Nelly Gray (song), 19th century anti-slavery ballad written and composed by Benjamin Hanby in 1856